Daniel Robertson may refer to:
 Daniel A. Robertson (born 1812), newspaper editor and Minnesota politician
 Daniel Robertson (outfielder) (born 1985), baseball outfielder
 Daniel Robertson (infielder) (born 1994), baseball shortstop
 Daniel Robertson (architect) (died 1849), architect
 Daniel Robertson (colonial administrator) (1813–1892), British colonial administrator
 Daniel Robertson (British Army officer) (1733–1819), British military officer in North America